Isophysis  is a  genus of herbaceous, perennial and rhizomatous plants in the Iris family (Iridaceae). A monotypic genus formerly known as Hewardia, it contains a single species, Isophysis tasmanica, endemic to the mountains of Western Tasmania growing in heathland on sandy soils. It has grass-like foliage and star-like dark red-purple or yellow flowers with reflexed tepals. A characteristic feature of this species is its superior ovary, which distinguishes it from any other member of Iridaceae. The genus name is derived from the Greek words iso, meaning "equal", and physis, meaning "bladder".

The former genus name Hewardia is used as a landmark name in Tasmania's southwest wilderness such as Hewardia Ridge on Mt. Picton located near Pineapple flats, named after the Pineapple Grass.

References

External links 
 Image of Isophysis tasmanica 
 Image of Isophysis tasmanica  from Australian Plant Image Index
 

Iridaceae genera
Monotypic Asparagales genera
Flora of Tasmania
Endemic flora of Tasmania
Iridaceae